Prinsep Ghat is a ghat built in 1841 during the British Raj, along the Kolkata bank of the Hooghly River in India. The Palladian porch in the memory of the eminent Anglo-Indian scholar and antiquary James Prinsep was designed by W. Fitzgerald and constructed in 1843.

Located between the Water Gate and the St George's Gate of the Fort William, the monument to Prinsep is rich in Greek and Gothic inlays. It was restored by the state's public works department in November 2001 and has since been well-maintained. In its initial years, all royal British entourages used the Prinsep Ghat jetty for embarkation and disembarkation.

Prinsep Ghat is one of the oldest recreational spots of Kolkata. People visit it in the evenings on weekends to go boating on the river, stroll along the bank and purchase food from stalls there. A  stretch of the beautified riverfront from Prinsep Ghat to Babughat (Baje Kadamtala Ghat) was inaugurated on 24 May 2012. It has illuminated and landscaped gardens and pathways, fountains and renovated ghats. One of the songs in the Bollywood film Parineeta was shot here on the ghats.

Prinsep Ghat also has a railway station named after it. The station is part of the Kolkata Circular Railway which is maintained by Eastern Railway. The station code is PPGT.

There is a jetty nearby called the Man-O-War jetty that belongs to the Kolkata Port Trust and commemorates the role played by the port in the Second World War. The jetty is mainly used by the Indian Navy.

Gallery

References

External links

Prinsep Ghat from Incredible India

Ghats in Kolkata
19th century in Kolkata
Monuments and memorials in Kolkata
1841 establishments in British India